Streptomyces similanensis is a bacterium species from the genus of Streptomyces which has been isolated from soil in Thailand.

See also 
 List of Streptomyces species

References 

 

similanensis
Bacteria described in 2016